Federación Deportiva Obrera (Workers Sport Federation, FDO) was a sporting organisation in Argentina, made up by more than 60 football clubs. The federation was founded in 1924, on the initiative of the Communist Party of Argentina. Most FDO clubs were under the control of the Communist Party and worked in close cooperation with the neighbourhood committees of the party. FDO was led by Orestes Ghioldi and Enrique Chiarante. FDO players boycotted interviews for newspapers where there were labour disputes. FDO was dissolved by the Uriburu regime in 1930.

References

Football governing bodies in Argentina
Defunct association football governing bodies
Communist sports organizations
1924 establishments in Argentina
1930 disestablishments in Argentina
Sports organizations established in 1924
Organizations disestablished in 1930
Defunct sports governing bodies in Argentina